Marc Hauser (September 25, 1952 – December 30, 2018) was an American photographer from Chicago. He took photographs of celebrities like Woody Allen, John Belushi, Eric Clapton, Cindy Crawford, Mick Jagger, Michael Jordan, Sophia Loren, Oprah, Dolly Parton, and Dennis Rodman. He also took the picture for John Mellencamp's Scarecrow album cover.

Early life
Hauser grew up in Wilmette and attended New Trier High School.

References

1950s births
2018 deaths
People from Chicago
Photographers from Illinois
20th-century American photographers
21st-century American photographers
New Trier High School alumni